Buysscheure (from Dutch, Buisscheure in modern Dutch spelling) is a commune in the Nord department in northern France.

The source of the river Yser is located here.

Population

Heraldry

See also
Communes of the Nord department

References

Communes of Nord (French department)
French Flanders